Gijounet is a commune in the Tarn department in southern France.

Geography
The river Gijou forms part of the commune's north-eastern border, then flows northwestward through the northern part of the commune.

See also
Communes of the Tarn department

References

Communes of Tarn (department)